Schnell Meister (foaled 23 March 2018) is a German-bred Japanese-trained Thoroughbred racehorse. He showed promise as a two-year-old in 2020 when he won both of his races. In the following spring he finished second in the Yayoi Sho before winning the Grade 1 NHK Mile Cup.

Background
Schnell Meister is a bay colt with a small white star bred in Germany by the Japanese breeding company Northern Farm. He entered the ownership of the Northern Farm associate Sunday Racing and was sent into training with Takahisa Tezuka.

He was from the third crop of foals sired by Kingman who was named Cartier Horse of the Year in 2014 when he won the Irish 2,000 Guineas, St James's Palace Stakes, Sussex Stakes and Prix Jacques Le Marois. Schnell Meister was the first foal of his dam Serienholde, a top class racemare who won the Preis der Diana as a three-year-old in 2016. She was a descendant of the German broodmare Suleika (foaled 1954) who was the ancestor of numerous major winners including Slip Anchor, Manhattan Cafe and Buena Vista.

Racing career

2020: two-year-old season
Schnell Meister made a successful racecourse debut at Sapporo Racecourse on 9 September when he won an event for previously unraced juveniles over 1500 metres on firm ground. Ridden by Takeshi Yokoyama he started the 1.1/1 favourite and took the lead in the straight before prevailing by three quarters of a length from Ten War Cry. After a break of three months the colt returned to the track in Nakayama Racecourse in December when he was partnered by Christophe Lemaire and went off favourite for the 1600 metre Hiiragi Sho. He raced in mid-division before going to the front in the straight and came home three lengths clear of Wazamono with Arabian Night in third.

2021: three-year-old season
For his three-year-old debut Schnell Meister was stepped up in class for the Grade 2 Yayoi Sho (a trial race for the Satsuki Sho) over 2000 metres at Nakayama on 7 March. With Lemaire in the saddle, and starting 3.9/1 second choice in the ten-runner field he raced in second place behind Titleholder, and although he was unable to challenge the front-running winner he held on to finish runner-up, a neck ahead of the favourite Danon The Kid. The fact that the colt had been unable to close on the winner in the closing stages of the race led Takahisa Tezuka to abandon plans to run him in the Satsuki Sho and bring him back in distance.

On 9 May Schnell Meister was partnered by Lemaire when he was one of eighteen three-year-olds to contest the 26th edition of the Grade 1 NHK Mile Cup over 1600 metres at Tokyo Racecourse. He went off the 2.7/1 second favourite behind Grenadier Guards in a field which also included Bathrat Leon (winner of the New Zealand Trophy), Ho O Amazon (Arlington Cup), Rooks Nest (Falcon Stakes), Pixie Knight (Shinzan Kinen) and Shock Action (Niigata Nisai Stakes). Schnell Meister settled in mid-division as Pixie Knight set the pace from Ho O Amazon and Grenadier Guards and turned into the straight in ninth place. In the closing stages he produced a sustained run on the outside and caught the filly Songline on the line to win by a nose. Grenadier Guards was two and a half lengths back in third to complete a 1-2-3 for Sunday Racing. Lemaire, who was recording his 37th Grade 1 race win in Japan, commented; "He took some time to get into gear but eventually got into a good rhythm and responded strongly in the critical stages... There is still a lot of greenness in Schnell Meister and a lot of room for improvement but once he's established himself physically, he should be able to handle the best."

Pedigree

References

2018 racehorse births
Racehorses bred in Germany
Racehorses trained in Japan
Thoroughbred family 16-c